General elections were held in the Northern Mariana Islands on 7 November 2009, electing the Governor, the Legislature, four mayors, the Board of Education and nine municipal council members. There were also four referendums.

Background
A total of 16,146 voters registered to vote with the Commonwealth Election Commission for the 2009 election. That is a 15% increase in voters compared to the 15,118 people who registered to vote in the 2005 general election. Precinct 1 on Saipan, which includes the villages of San Antonio, San Vicente and Koblerville, had the most number of registered voters at 4,331. Voter registration ended on September 18, 2009.

A total of 109 candidates vied for the 43 elected positions in the Northern Mariana Islands in the 2009 election. The contested offices included the offices of governor & lieutenant governor, the twenty seats in the House of Representative, six (of nine) seats in the Senate as well as mayoral posts and various local offices.

At least 18,000 ballots designed to be read by counting machines were printed in Alabama for the 2009 election, according to the executive director of the Election Commission, Robert Guerrero.

Campaign
Major election issues included the Commonwealth's faltering economy and the federalization of the Northern Mariana Islands' immigration by the United States government.

Republican Hofschneider and his running mate, Palacios, challenged incumbent Governor Benigno Fitial and his running mate, Lieutenant Governor Eloy Inos, in the general election. Former legislator Juan "Pan" Guerrero ran as an independent, with sitting CNMI Rep. Joe Camacho as his running mate. Another former legislator, Ramon "Kumoi" Deleon Guerrero, campaigned as an independent, with former Education Commissioner David M. Borja as his running mate. The race was widely viewed as a rematch between Fitial and Hofschneider, who was narrowly defeated in 2005.

The gubernatorial candidates focused heavily on the estimated 3,000 Northern Mariana Islanders residing on the United States mainland, many of whom were eligible to vote be absentee ballot. Three of the four gubernatorial candidates - Governor Fitial, Hofschneider and Juan Pan Guerrero - attended a Labor Day festival for Northern Mariana Islanders in San Diego, California, in September 2009. Independent candidate Juan "Pan" Guerrero and his running mate, Joe Camacho, campaigned throughout the western United States in August and September. Guerrero and Camacho began campaigning in Salem and Portland, Oregon, before travelling to Seattle, Boise, Idaho, San Francisco, Las Vegas, San Diego and Honolulu.

Gubernatorial election
The incumbent governor Benigno R. Fitial of the Covenant Party, successfully ran for a second term; his running mate, Lt. Governor Eloy Inos, was elected to his first full term. Fitial faced three challengers in the November 7 general election: Republican nominee Heinz Hofschneider, independent Juan "Pan" Guerrero, and independent Ramon "Kumoi" Deleon Guerrero.

Because of a law signed by Governor Fitial on July 24, 2009, a runoff election between the candidates who received the highest and second-highest vote totals would be required if no candidate obtained more than 50% of the overall vote. Under this 2009 law, a runoff would occur 14 days after the results of the general election are certified by the Commonwealth Election Commission.  This election indeed required a runoff, as neither Fitial nor Hofschneider garnered more than 50% of the vote in the November 7 election.

On election day, Republican challenger Hofschneider received 4,900 votes and incumbent Governor Fitial received 4,892 votes, therefore advancing to the runoff election held on November 23, 2009. Of the 13,784 total votes cast in the first round on November 7, Hofschneider led Fitial by just 8 votes, the closest gubernatorial election in the history of the Northern Mariana Islands. In the November 23 runoff election, Governor Fital was reelected by a 370-vote margin. With a margin of 2.8%, this election was the closest race of the 2009 gubernatorial election cycle.

Fitial was elected to serve a five-year term in office as governor instead of the normal four-year term, due to the Senate Legislative Initiative 16-11, which was one of the four ballot initiatives ratified in the November 7 election. Under the Senate Legislative Initiative 16-11, future general (including gubernatorial) elections will be held only in even-numbered years instead of odd-numbered years, such as 2009. Therefore, the next gubernatorial election took place in 2014 rather than 2013.

Candidates

Covenant Party
Benigno R. Fitial, incumbent Governor of the Northern Mariana Islands (serving since 2006) and former Northern Mariana Islands Representatives (including tenure as Speaker of the House)
Lieutenant Governor Eloy Inos is Fitial's running mate. Inos was appointed and confirmed as Lt. Governor on May 1, 2009, following the resignation of Timothy Villagomez.

Republican Party
Former Northern Mariana Governor Juan N. Babauta, a Republican, declared his intention to run for governor and challenge Fitial in January 2009. His running mate was Galvin Deleon Guerrero, a member of the CNMI Board of Education. 
Babauta was then defeated in the Republican primary by sitting CNMI Rep. Heinz Sablan Hofschneider, a former Speaker of the House, for the Republican Party nomination. Hofschneider's running mate is CNMI Rep. Arnold Indalecio Palacios, the current Speaker of the House.

Before the Republican primary, which was held on June 27, 2009, Hofschneider and Babauta signed a unity pledge, with each candidate pledging to support the winner of the primary. Hofschneider won the primary on June 27 with about 53% of the votes cast. Hofschneider won at six of the eight precincts. After the results were announced, the candidates convened and embraced; Babauta threw his support to Hofschneider and said that he would accept the people's decision. After Babauta had asked his supporters to vote for Hofschneider in the general election, Hofschneider called Babauta and his supporters "a crucial part of the campaign toward November."

Independents
Juan "Pan" Guerrero, chairman of the board for the Northern Marianas Retirement Fund (serving 2006-2009); former Northern Mariana Islands Senator (serving 1986-1990) and Representative (serving 1984-1985)
Joe Camacho is Guerrero's running mate. Camacho is currently a Republican Representative and Floor Leader of the Northern Mariana Islands House of Representatives.
Ramon "Kumoi" Deleon Guerrero, former Northern Mariana Islands Senator (serving 2000-2004)
David Borja, a former Education Commissioner, is Guerrero's running mate.

Democratic Party
For the first time in its history, the Democratic Party of the Northern Mariana Islands did not nominate a candidate for Governor in 2009.  The only offices which were contested by the Democrats in 2009 were certain seats in the legislature and the mayorship of Saipan.

Polling

Election day
Polls on election day opened at 7 a.m. on November 7, 2009.  Three of the four gubernatorial candidates cast their ballots in the morning at Garapan Elementary School in Garapan, Saipan. Incumbent Governor Benigno Fitial and First Lady Josie Fitial voted at 7:10 a.m., Ramon "Kumoi" Deleon Guerrero arrived at the school at 7:20 a.m. and independent candidate Juan Pan Guerrero voted after 9 a.m. Republican candidate Heinz Hofschneider also voted at Garapan Elementary School at 6 p.m. later that day. An estimated 84% of registered voters participated in the election.

In the November 7 general election, Republican challenger Heinz Hofschneider received 4,900 votes and incumbent Governor Benigno Fitial received 4,892 votes, therefore both advanced to the runoff election slated for November 23, 2009.  A total of 13,784 votes were cast in the first round. Hofschneider led Fitial by just eight votes, the closest gubernatorial election in the history of the Northern Mariana Islands. Independent candidates Juan Pan Guerrero and Ramon "Kumoi" Deleon Guerrero came in 3rd and 4th place respectively and, therefore, did not qualify for the second runoff election.

Under a 2009 law signed by Governor Benigno Fitial, a runoff election is required within fourteen days of the if no candidate obtained 50% of the popular vote plus 1. Since neither Fitial nor Hofschneider garnered more than 50% of the vote, a runoff date was set for November 23, 2009.

Runoff
The Commonwealth Election Commission certified the results of the general election on November 9 and set the date of the runoff election between Fitial and Hofschneider for Monday, November 23. In a November 17 memorandum, Governor Fitial declared November 23 a legal holiday in the Northern Mariana Islands to encourage voter turnout.

The candidates qualifying for the runoff on November 23, 2009, were incumbent Covenant Party Governor Benigno Fitial and Republican candidate, Rep. Heinz Hofschneider.  The incumbent ticket of Fitial-Inos campaigned for re-election on a theme of "proven leadership and proven experience," while the rival Hofscneider-Palacios campaign advocated a "change in leadership" to voters.

Both the Fitial and Hofschneider campaigns reached out to supporters of the independent candidates who did not qualify for the November 23rd runoff, Juan Pan Guerrero and Ramon "Kumoi" Deleon Guerrero.  The support of these independent voters was considered vital both Fitial's and Hofschneider's candidacies.

Former independent candidate Juan "Pan" Guerrero declined to endorse either Fitial or Hofschneider in one-page statement released on November 13, 2009. Instead, Guerrero, who came in third in the gubernatorial election, called on CNMI voters, especially his supporters, to support the candidate who best "represents a better future for themselves, their families, and the Commonwealth." Guerrero further elaborated that, "As soon as it was clear that I would not be in the runoff election, I urged supporters to make their own choices about whom to support-Ben and Eloy or Heinz and Arnold." In his statement, Guerrero noted that he make no further public statements concerning the election before the runoff.

Guerrero running mate in the 2009 election, Joe Camacho, issued his own statement on November 12 endorsing the Covenant Party ticket of Governor Benigno Fitial and Lt. Governor Eloy Inos for re-election. Camacho's brother, Clyde Norita, who was the chairman for the Executive Committee to Elect Juan Pan and Joe Camacho, also endorsed Fitial and Inos.

Former independent candidate Ramon "Kumoi" Deleon Guerrero, who came in fourth place in the general election, endorsed Heinz Hofschneider and Arnold Palacios for governor and lt. governor. Deleon Guerrero cited the wishes of his supporters and support for reforms advocated by Hofschneider, as well as alleged broken promises by the Fitial administration, for his endorsement. He further cited similarities between his own campaign and Hofschneider's messages, "Hofschneider and Palacios have whole-heartedly embraced these visions. They have even taken to heart, our campaign theme of "Time For Change." Deleon Guerrero stated that Fitial had failed to deliver on a number of promises during his term in office, such as economic growth, improved healthcare and the removal of fuel surcharges.

However, Deleon Guerrero's running mate, former Education Commissioner David Borja, endorsed Governor Fitial for re-election. Fitial was also endorsed by the Deleon Guerrero-Borja campaign chairman, Rudy R. Sablan, and seven other senior members of the campaign team.

On December 8, after all ballots had been counted, Fitial was declared the victor in the runoff. He and Inos received 6,610 votes, while Hofschneider and Palacios received 6,240 votes.

Results

Legislature
All 20 seats in the Northern Mariana Islands House of Representatives were contested in the election. Six seats in the Northern Mariana Islands Senate were up for election.

Before the 2009 election, the Republican Party controlled the 20-member House of Representatives with a 12-seat majority. The Senate was controlled by the Covenant Party in a coalition with the Democrats and a lone independent.

Senate

House

Mayoral elections
All four mayoral posts were up for election across the Commonwealth.

There were nine candidates for mayor on the island of Saipan: Republican Donald Flores, who won the election, as well as Covenant candidate Marian Tudela, Democrat Angelo Villagomez, and Independent candidates Candy Taman, Joe Sanchez, Roman Benavente, Juan Demapan, Tony Camacho and Lino Tenorio.

Board of Education

Tinian and Aguiguan

Saipan

Other elected offices
Voters also elected nine municipal council members.

Referendums

Education system

References

Northern Mariana
 
Referendums in the Northern Mariana Islands
Northern Mariana Islands